Dokument (subtitled Izštekani session 17.12.2004.) is the sixth album by the Croatian alternative rock band Pips, Chips & Videoclips, released in December 2005.

It is the band's first live album and features 11 tracks recorded live in the Izštekani (translated literally as Unplugged) acoustic music radio programme broadcast on the Slovenian radio station Val 202 on 17 December 2004.

Reception
Croatian rock critic Aleksandar Dragaš described Dokument as "well-thought-out, precise, and flawlessly performed", comparing it favorably with the band's then-recent studio albums.

Track listing
"Plači" 
"Rosita Pedringo"
"Mak" 
"Mrgud, gorostas i tat" 
"Baka Lucija" 
"2x2" 
"Poštar lakog sna" 
"Nogomet" 
"Narko" 
"Porculan"
"Na putu prema dole"

References

External links
Pips, Chips & Videoclips discography 

2005 live albums
Pips, Chips & Videoclips albums